Sally Alina Ingeborg Salminen (25 April 1906 – 18 July 1976), from 1940 Salminen-Dührkop, was an internationally renowned author from Vargata, the Åland Islands, Finland. She was nominated for the Nobel Prize in Literature three times.

Biography
Born in Vårdö, Åland, Sally Salminen was the eighth child of twelve. Already as a child she entertained notions of becoming an author, but she considered herself to be too poor and unknowledgeable to succeed as a writer. After her confirmation, she worked in the village grocery store, until she moved to Stockholm, Sweden to work as a maid. During her tenure in Sweden she took correspondent courses and read books in her spare time.

In 1930 Sally and her sister Aili moved to New York City, United States. While in New York, she wrote during her spare time, and it was here she started writing the manuscript for her first (and most famous) novel, Katrina. Finland-Swedish publisher Holger Schildts Förlag announced in 1936 a writing contest, for which Salminen submitted her manuscript. Her submission won, and Katrina was published the same year. The novel depicts the life of an Ostrobothnian woman, Katrina, who moves to Åland following her marriage. Katrina became an international success, eventually being translated into more than twenty languages.

Sally Salminen married Danish painter Johannes Dürhkop in 1940, and relocated to Denmark. Salminen remained a prolific writer, but she was never able to replicate the success of her debut novel, Katrina. Besides Katrina, Prins Efflam (1953) and Vid Havet (1963) are considered her most notable works.

Family
Several of Salminen's siblings were notable authors in their own right. Her sister Aili Nordgren (née Salminen) (1908–1995) wrote several books. Her younger brother Runar Salminen (1912–1988) released several anthologies of poetry, and elder brother Uno Salminen (1905–1991) wrote a trilogy of books about the fictional character Erik Sundblom.

Additionally, Aili Nordgren's son Ralf Nordgren (born 1936) and Uno Salminen's daughter Christina Remmer (born 1941) have authored several books. Another notable author born on Åland, Johannes Salminen, is however not related to Sally Salminen.

Bibliography

Novels
Katrina (1936)
Den långa våren (1939)
På lös sand (1941)
Lars Laurila (1943)
Nya land (1945)
Barndomens land (1948)
Små världar (1949)
Klyftan och stjärnan (1951)
Prins Efflam (1953)
Spår på jorden (1961)
Vid havet (1963)

Factual
Jerusalem (1970)
På färder i Israel (1971)

Autobiographical
Upptäcktsresan (1966)
Min amerikanska saga (1968)
I Danmark (1972)
Världen öppnar sig (1974)

References

External links
 Biography of Sally Salminen, Library of Mariehamn, Åland
 Sällskapet Salminens Vänner r.f., now defunct organisation 
 Salminen, Sally at Uppslagsverket Finland 
 Salminen, Sally at Biografiskt lexikon för Finland 
 Short biographies of Ralf Nordgren, Aili Nordgren, Runar Salminen and Sally Salminen 

1906 births
1976 deaths
People from Vårdö
People from Turku and Pori Province (Grand Duchy of Finland)
Writers from Åland
Finnish writers in Swedish
Finnish women novelists
Maids
Swedish women novelists
20th-century Finnish women writers
20th-century Finnish novelists
Finnish emigrants to Sweden
Finnish emigrants to Denmark
20th-century Swedish women writers
20th-century Swedish novelists
Burials at Holmen Cemetery
Swedish domestic workers